These are the official results of the Men's 50 km Walk at the 1992 Summer Olympics in Barcelona, Spain. There were a total number of 45 competitors, with seven athletes who were disqualified.

Medalists

Abbreviations
All times shown are in hours:minutes:seconds

Records

Final classification
Held on August 7, 1992

See also
 1990 Men's European Championships 50 km Walk (Split)
 1991 Men's World Championship 50 km Walk (Tokyo)
 1992 Race Walking Year Ranking
 1993 Men's World Championships 50 km Walk (Stuttgart)

References

External links
 Official Report
 Results

W
Racewalking at the Olympics
Men's events at the 1992 Summer Olympics